Asim Hussain, SI, NI (born 28 November 1953) is a Pakistani-Canadian, active in the fields of health, education, and Pakistani politics. He is chairman of Ziauddin Group of Hospitals in Karachi, and former Advisor of Prime Minister for Ministry of Oil and Natural Resources, Pakistan. He was a member of the Senate of Pakistan as part of Pakistan Peoples Party from 2009 to 2015.

In recognition of his services to the nation in the fields of education and health care he was conferred with the Sitara-i-Imtiaz and Nishan-e-Imtiaz in 2005 and 2013, respectively.

Early life 
Hussain was born in Karachi on 28 November 1953. After receiving early education at Karachi Grammar School, Cadet College Petaro, Dow Medical College, he went to Europe for further studies.

Career 

Hussain served as the Chairman of National Reconstruction Bureau with the status of Federal Minister from May 2008 until November 2009. He was the Advisor to the Prime Minister for Petroleum & Natural Resources/Federal Minister from November 2008 until August 2009. He was the Honorary Personal Physician to the President of Pakistan from 12 December 2009. He was the Advisor/Federal Minister Petroleum & Natural Resource from May 2011 until May 2013.

On 27 August 2015, Hussain was detained by the authorities in an ongoing operation within the city of Karachi launched by the Pakistani Army.

He was appointed as the Chairman of Sindh Higher Education in 2014. In 2018, he was re-appointed for a second term, which ended in 2022.

Personal life 
Hussain ran a travel agency and invested in some property, but did not have the needed Canadian credentials to work as a doctor. He is the grandson of Sir Ziauddin Ahmad.

References

External links
 Asim Hussain on Facebook
Asim Hussain on Twitter
Official University Page
 Higher Education Commission, Pakistan

People from Karachi
1953 births
Muhajir people
Pakistani landowners
Pakistani chief executives
Karachi Grammar School alumni
Pakistani medical doctors
Cadet College Petaro alumni
People acquitted of corruption
Recipients of Sitara-i-Imtiaz
Recipients of Hilal-i-Imtiaz
Pakistani people convicted of tax crimes
Pakistani prisoners and detainees
Pakistan People's Party politicians
Businesspeople from Karachi
Politicians from Karachi
Living people
Dow Medical College alumni
Pakistani politicians convicted of corruption